Miami County Airport  is a public airport  southwest of Paola, in Miami County, Kansas. The airport was founded in December 1951.

References

External links 

 http://www.airnav.com/airport/K81
 http://www.miamicountyks.org/137/Airport
 http://www.websmokin.com/

Airports in Kansas
Buildings and structures in Miami County, Kansas